Jari Koenraat (born 26 September 1995) is a Dutch football player. He plays for RKC Waalwijk.

Club career
He made his Eerste Divisie debut for RKC Waalwijk on 18 August 2017 in a game against FC Emmen.

References

External links
 
 

1995 births
People from Loon op Zand
Living people
Dutch footballers
Eerste Divisie players
RKC Waalwijk players
Association football midfielders
Footballers from North Brabant